Myrtle Bank is a historic house in Natchez, Mississippi, USA.

History
Sir William Dunbar surveyed the land in the 18th century. It was granted to George Overarker, a planter, in 1795. Overarker, who also owned Hawthorne Place and Hope Farm, built Myrtle Bank prior to 1818.

By 1835, Alfred Cochran and his wife Eliza, who was William Dunbar's great-granddaughter, purchased the house. Two decades later, in 1856, it was purchased by Benjamin Wade, a planter. Wade leased it to The Natchez Young Ladies Institute, a girl's boarding school, until the outset of the American Civil War in 1861. The house remained in the Wade family until the 1870s.

The house was restored by a new owner in 1957.

Architectural significance
It has been listed on the National Register of Historic Places since December 22, 1978.

References

Houses on the National Register of Historic Places in Mississippi
Houses completed in 1816
Houses in Adams County, Mississippi